Haitianism was a widespread fear period during the 19th-century history of America, especially in the United States, the Captaincy General of Cuba and the Empire of Brazil, marked by a widespread fear of a black or slave insurrection, due to real or imagined events; real events included those such as the 1811 German Coast Uprising and the Malê revolt. At its height, concerns over the effects of radical political agitation in American societies and the alleged spread of insurrectionism and rebellion in the slave populations of America fueled a general sense of concern if not paranoia.

References

Bibliography
 

History of Haiti